The Parker 2nd Ranger, also called the Parker Ranger is an American mid-wing, single-seat motor glider that was designed and constructed by W.L. Parker of La Grande, Oregon, first flying in 1967.

Design and development
The engine was replaced with a Richter  powerplant which rectified this defect. The engine is retractable and mounted behind the cockpit.

The aircraft is constructed from aluminium. The  wing employs a laminated aluminium spar and a NACA 4418 airfoil. The Ranger is not equipped with any glidepath control devices, such as dive brakes. The landing gear is a single centreline mainwheel plus a nose-mounted second wheel to allow taxiing.

The aircraft was registered with the Federal Aviation Administration in the Experimental - amateur-built category. Only one was built.

Operational history
Tillamook Air Museum - sole example

Specifications (2nd Ranger)

See also

References

1960s United States sailplanes
Homebuilt aircraft
Motor gliders
Aircraft first flown in 1967